is a Japanese footballer who plays for Azul Claro Numazu.

Career
After attending the Osaka University of Health and Sport Sciences, he joined Nara Club in mid-2015. Before the 2017 season, his manager Norihiro Satsukawa turns Sakamoto from a defender to a centre-forward: as a result, Sakamoto scored 18 goals and he was named the JFL's top-scorer. After this performance, he opted to sign for Azul Claro Numazu.

Club statistics
Updated to 7 February 2021.

References

External links

Profile at Nara Club
Profile at Azul Claro Numazu

1993 births
Living people
Association football people from Osaka Prefecture
Japanese footballers
J3 League players
Japan Football League players
Nara Club players
Azul Claro Numazu players
FC Osaka players
Association football defenders
People from Tondabayashi, Osaka